Biggar is a former provincial electoral division for the Legislative Assembly of the province of Saskatchewan, Canada, centred on the town of Biggar. This district was created before the 3rd Saskatchewan general election in 1912. The riding was dissolved and combined with the Rosetown district to form Rosetown-Biggar before the 23rd Saskatchewan general election in 1995. It was the constituency of Premier Woodrow S. Lloyd.

It is now part of the Biggar-Sask Valley constituency.

Members of the Legislative Assembly

Election results

|-

|Conservative
|Lachlan MacDonald
|align="right"|552
|align="right"|42.27%
|align="right"|–
|- bgcolor="white"
!align="left" colspan=3|Total
!align="right"|1,306
!align="right"|100.00%
!align="right"|

|-

|Conservative
|William George Dunbar
|align="right"|1,500
|align="right"|42.99%
|align="right"|+0.72
|- bgcolor="white"
!align="left" colspan=3|Total
!align="right"|3,489
!align="right"|100.00%
!align="right"|

|-

|- bgcolor="white"
!align="left" colspan=3|Total
!align="right"|3,810
!align="right"|100.00%
!align="right"|

|-

|- bgcolor="white"
!align="left" colspan=3|Total
!align="right"|3,318
!align="right"|100.00%
!align="right"|

|-

|style="width: 130px"|Conservative
|William Willoughby Miller
|align="right"|2,733
|align="right"|51.67%
|align="right"|-

|- bgcolor="white"
!align="left" colspan=3|Total
!align="right"|5,289
!align="right"|100.00%
!align="right"|

|-

|Farmer-Labour
|Warren Hart
|align="right"|2,044
|align="right"|36.33%
|align="right"|–

|Conservative
|William Willoughby Miller
|align="right"|1,296
|align="right"|23.03%
|align="right"|-28.64
|- bgcolor="white"
!align="left" colspan=3|Total
!align="right"|5,627
!align="right"|100.00%
!align="right"|

|-

|style="width: 130px"|CCF
|John Allan Young
|align="right"|3,341
|align="right"|45.28%
|align="right"|+8.95

|- bgcolor="white"
!align="left" colspan=3|Total
!align="right"|7,378
!align="right"|100.00%
!align="right"|

|-

|style="width: 130px"|CCF
|Woodrow S. Lloyd
|align="right"|3,633
|align="right"|62.76%
|align="right"|+17.48

|- bgcolor="white"
!align="left" colspan=3|Total
!align="right"|5,789
!align="right"|100.00%
!align="right"|

|-

|style="width: 130px"|CCF
|Woodrow S. Lloyd
|align="right"|3,695
|align="right"|55.30%
|align="right"|-7.46

|- bgcolor="white"
!align="left" colspan=3|Total
!align="right"|6,682
!align="right"|100.00%
!align="right"|

|-

|style="width: 130px"|CCF
|Woodrow S. Lloyd
|align="right"|3,811
|align="right"|64.18%
|align="right"|+8.88

|- bgcolor="white"
!align="left" colspan=3|Total
!align="right"|5,938
!align="right"|100.00%
!align="right"|

|-

|style="width: 130px"|CCF
|Woodrow S. Lloyd
|align="right"|3,182
|align="right"|56.10%
|align="right"|-8.08

|- bgcolor="white"
!align="left" colspan=3|Total
!align="right"|5,672
!align="right"|100.00%
!align="right"|

|-

|style="width: 130px"|CCF
|Woodrow S. Lloyd
|align="right"|3,049
|align="right"|51.66%
|align="right"|-4.44

|Prog. Conservative
|Jack Lehmond
|align="right"|663
|align="right"|11.23%
|align="right"|-

|- bgcolor="white"
!align="left" colspan=3|Total
!align="right"|5,902
!align="right"|100.00%
!align="right"|

|-

|style="width: 130px"|CCF
|Woodrow S. Lloyd
|align="right"|2,875
|align="right"|48.02%
|align="right"|-3.64

|Prog. Conservative
|George Loucks
|align="right"|1,120
|align="right"|18.71%
|align="right"|+7.48
|- bgcolor="white"
!align="left" colspan=3|Total
!align="right"|5,987
!align="right"|100.00%
!align="right"|

|-

|style="width: 130px"|NDP
|Woodrow S. Lloyd
|align="right"|2,916
|align="right"|50.09%
|align="right"|+2.07

|Prog. Conservative
|Peter Wiebe
|align="right"|1,334
|align="right"|22.92%
|align="right"|+4.21
|- bgcolor="white"
!align="left" colspan=3|Total
!align="right"|5,821
!align="right"|100.00%
!align="right"|

|-

|style="width: 130px"|NDP
|Elwood L. Cowley
|align="right"|3,599
|align="right"|61.96%
|align="right"|+11.87

|- bgcolor="white"
!align="left" colspan=3|Total
!align="right"|5,809
!align="right"|100.00%
!align="right"|

|-

|style="width: 130px"|NDP
|Elwood L. Cowley
|align="right"|3,223
|align="right"|48.47%
|align="right"|-13.49

|Prog. Conservative
|Ralph Young
|align="right"|1,906
|align="right"|28.67%
|align="right"|-

|- bgcolor="white"
!align="left" colspan=3|Total
!align="right"|6,649
!align="right"|100.00%
!align="right"|

|-

|style="width: 130px"|NDP
|Elwood L. Cowley
|align="right"|4,787
|align="right"|55.61%
|align="right"|+7.14

|Prog. Conservative
|Roy Norris
|align="right"|3,270
|align="right"|37.98%
|align="right"|+9.31

|- bgcolor="white"
!align="left" colspan=3|Total
!align="right"|8,609
!align="right"|100.00%
!align="right"|

|-

|style="width: 130px"|Progressive Conservative
|Harry Baker
|align="right"|4,437
|align="right"|55.63%
|align="right"|+17.65

|style="width: 130px"|NDP
|Elwood L. Cowley
|align="right"|3,070
|align="right"|38.50%
|align="right"|-17.11

|- bgcolor="white"
!align="left" colspan=3|Total
!align="right"|7,975
!align="right"|100.00%
!align="right"|

|-

|style="width: 130px"|Progressive Conservative
|Harry Baker
|align="right"|3,882
|align="right"|50.26%
|align="right"|-5.37

|NDP
|Pat Trask
|align="right"|3,449
|align="right"|44.65%
|align="right"|+6.15

|- bgcolor="white"
!align="left" colspan=3|Total
!align="right"|7,724
!align="right"|100.00%
!align="right"|

|-

|style="width: 130px"|NDP
|Grant Whitmore
|align="right"|3,710
|align="right"|47.62%
|align="right"|+2.97

|Prog. Conservative
|Harry Baker
|align="right"|2,307
|align="right"|29.62%
|align="right"|-20.64

|Independent
|Donald W. Kavanagh
|align="right"|65
|align="right"|0.83%
|align="right"|-
|- bgcolor="white"
!align="left" colspan=3|Total
!align="right"|7,790
!align="right"|100.00%
!align="right"|

See also
Electoral district (Canada)
List of Saskatchewan provincial electoral districts
List of Saskatchewan general elections
List of political parties in Saskatchewan
Biggar, Saskatchewan

References
 Saskatchewan Archives Board - Saskatchewan Election Results By Electoral Division

Former provincial electoral districts of Saskatchewan
Biggar, Saskatchewan

fr:Biggar (circonscription saskatchewanaise)